Giovanni Battista Giustammiani, also called il Francesino (active 1608 to 1643) was a French-Italian painter active mainly painting sacred subjects in a late-Mannerist style in Siena, Tuscany, Italy.

Biography 
He painted the Miracles of Benedictine Saints for the sacristy of San Domenico. He also painted a glory of angels for the Sacristy of the Siena Cathedral. He painted an altarpieces depicting the Circumcision of Jesus for the church of San Raimondo.

References

16th-century births
17th-century deaths
17th-century Italian painters
Italian male painters
17th-century French painters
French male painters
Painters from Siena